Lawrence Borthwick Kelly (29 April 1883 – 5 May 1955) was an Australian politician and a member of the New South Wales Legislative Assembly  from  1947 until his death. He was a member of the Labor Party (ALP).

Kelly was born in Dumfries, Scotland and was educated to elementary level. He worked from the age of 12 as a coal-miner. In 1911 he arrived in Australia and after initially working as a miner in the Hunter Region, found employment with the New South Wales Government Railways. He joined the Labor party and became an official with the Australian Railways Union. Kelly was a councillor on the Bulli Shire Council in 1927-32 and 1935–47.

He was the shire president in 1929-31 and 1945–47. Kelly was elected to the New South Wales Parliament as the Labor member for the  seat of Bulli at the 1947 state election after the sitting Labor member John Sweeney retired.

He retained the seat for the Labor Party until 1955 when he died in office. He did not hold party, parliamentary or ministerial office. His son also, Laurie Kelly was the Speaker of the New South Wales Legislative Assembly in the 1980s.

References

 

1883 births
1955 deaths
Members of the New South Wales Legislative Assembly
Australian Labor Party members of the Parliament of New South Wales
20th-century Australian politicians
Mayors of places in New South Wales
Scottish emigrants to Australia